B.D. Somani International School is an International Baccalaureate Diploma and IGCSE certified Reception to Grade 12 school in Mumbai, India. It is located in the Cuffe Parade area in South Mumbai.

History 
B.D. Somani was founded in 2006, starting with a two-year International Baccalaureate Diploma Program. In 2008, an IGCSE Program and primary school were started. It was founded by Aradhana Somani, an educationist whose other successful projects include G.D. Somani Memorial School, Mira Conscious Education Pre-school, and B.D. Somani Institute of Arts and Fashion Technology.

Summary 
B.D. Somani International School has 932 students from reception to grade 12. It is located in Cuffe Parade and is one of the top international schools in Mumbai. The school has two sections, primary school and secondary school. There are several subjects taught in B.D. Somani: Maths, Science, English, Social Science, Humanities, Core subject, French, Hindi, 
Geography, History, Music, Theatre/Drama, Physical Education and Information Technology/ Computer Science.

Primary school 
Minal Gala is the Primary School Principal. Primary school consists of early years (reception, junior kindergarten and kindergarten) and primary years (Grades 1 – 5).

Secondary school 
The Secondary School Principal is Navroz Billimoria. Secondary school consists of middle school (Grades 6 – 8) and high school (Grades 9 – 10; IGCSE Program) and (Grades 11 – 12; International Baccalaureate Diploma Program). There are 452 students. in secondary school with 71 teachers and 9 staff.  Most graduates pursue their tertiary education in the UK, US, Europe and Canada.

Campus 
The school has a huge field with artificial turf and other open spaces, with ample space for outdoor as well as indoor activities. Classrooms are air-conditioned. There are specialist rooms for art, music and theatre, information technology and science. Outdoor facilities include a block-building yard, basketball court and Capoeira room. There is a state-of-the-art auditorium for special occasions, in addition to the two existing hall-rooms, as well as a large, air-conditioned cafeteria.

The school shares an address with the G.D. Somani Memorial School, each school occupying one wing of the building and sharing some of the outdoor areas.

See also
 List of schools in Mumbai

References

External links

International Baccalaureate schools in India
Private schools in Mumbai
International schools in Mumbai
Educational institutions established in 2006
2006 establishments in Maharashtra